The Carson River is a river in the Kimberley region of Western Australia.

The headwaters of the river rise at the base of the Foster Range near the southwestern edge of the Drysdale River National Park.

The river has four tributaries, including Morgan River, Swida Creek and Pronga-Marie Creek. The river was named in 1886 by the explorer Charles Burrowes while surveying the area for the Victoria Squatting Company. He named it after the chairman of the company, David Carson.
The river contains several permanent pools where examples of Indigenous Australian art, known as the Gwion Gwion rock paintings, can be found along the cliff faces.

The traditional owners of the areas around the river are the Wilawila, Miwa and Wunambal peoples.

References

Rivers of the Kimberley region of Western Australia